Seo Ha-na(Korean:서하나) (born 7 June 1987) is a South Korean Paralympic judoka. She represented South Korea at the 2016 Summer Paralympics held in Rio de Janeiro, Brazil and she won one of the bronze medals in the women's 57 kg event.

References

External links 
 

Living people
1987 births
Place of birth missing (living people)
South Korean female judoka
Judoka at the 2016 Summer Paralympics
Medalists at the 2016 Summer Paralympics
Paralympic bronze medalists for South Korea
Paralympic medalists in judo
Paralympic judoka of South Korea
21st-century South Korean women